Bloodstain pattern analysis (BPA) is the field of forensic science that consists of the study and analysis of bloodstains at a known or suspected crime scene with the purpose of drawing conclusions about the nature, timing and other details of the crime. It is used mostly to study homicide or other violent crimes in which blood is present and can help in crime scene reconstruction. Since the late 1950s, BPA experts have claimed to be able to use biology, physics (fluid dynamics), and mathematical calculations to reconstruct with accuracy events at a crime scene, and these claims have been accepted by the criminal justice system in the US.

The validity of bloodstain pattern analysis has been questioned since the 1990s, and more recent studies cast significant doubt on its accuracy. A comprehensive 2009 National Academy of Sciences report concluded that "the uncertainties associated with bloodstain pattern analysis are enormous" and that purported bloodstain pattern experts' opinions are "more subjective than scientific." The report highlighted several incidents of blood spatter analysts overstating their qualifications and questioned the reliability of their methods. In 2021, the largest-to-date study on the accuracy of BPA was published, with results "show[ing] that [BPA conclusions] were often erroneous and often contradicted other analysts."

History

Early history 
Bloodstain pattern analysis has been used informally for centuries, but the first modern study of blood stains was in 1895. Dr. Eduard Piotrowski of the University of Kraków published a paper titled "On the formation, form, direction, and spreading of blood stains after blunt trauma to the head." He conducted his first experiments on rabbits. A number of publications describing various aspects of blood stains were published, but his publication did not lead to a systematic analysis. LeMoyne Snyder's widely used book Homicide Investigation (first published in 1941 and updated occasionally through at least the 1970s) also briefly mentioned details that later bloodstain experts would expand upon (e.g., that blood dries at a relatively predictable rate; that arterial blood is a brighter red color than other blood; that bloodstains tend to fall in certain patterns based on the motion of an attacker and victim). A 1952 episode of the police procedural radio series Dragnet made reference to bloodstain pattern analysis to reconstruct a shooting incident.

Acceptance as valid evidence in United States courts 
Between 1880 and 1957, courts in Michigan, Mississippi, Ohio, and California rejected expert testimony for bloodspatter analysis, generally holding that it added nothing to the jurors' own evaluations of bloodstains submitted as evidence. In 1957, the California Supreme Court became the first American court to accept expert testimony examining bloodstains, accepting as evidence the testimony of Paul L. Kirk, a professor of biochemistry and criminalistics. He would also testify in the Sam Sheppard case in 1966, when the wife of an osteopathic physician was beaten to death in her home, interpreting bloodspatter evidence as proof that the murderer was left-handed (Sheppard was right-handed). However, bloodstain pattern analysis would not begin to enter wide use until it was promoted by Herbert Leon MacDonell. MacDonell researched bloodstains with a grant from the United States Department of Justice, and which also published his research in the book "Flight Characteristics and Stain Patterns of Human Blood" (1971). MacDonell testified in court on multiple occasions as an expert of bloodstain analysis, and the legal precedent set by these cases led to its widespread use in American courts, although as early as 1980 some judges expressed strong doubts about its reliability, and it was not always accepted as evidence, especially in states with no prior rulings that relied on such evidence.

The first formal bloodstain training course was given by MacDonell in 1973 in Jackson, Mississippi. MacDonell taught workshops on how to conduct bloodstain analysis, and the newly trained bloodstain analysts, who often had received as little as 40 hours of instruction, in turn would give expert testimony in court cases. In 1983, the International Association of Bloodstain Pattern Analysts was founded by a group of blood stain analysts to help develop the emerging field of bloodstain pattern analysis.

Further investigation into its admissibility as evidence 
Starting in 1995, court cases where bloodstain analysts disagreed with each other raised concerns of the discipline's prediction's admissibility as evidence in court. In 2009, the National Academy of Sciences published an examination of forensic methods used in United States courts which harshly criticized both bloodstain pattern analysis and the credentials of the majority of the analysts and experts in the field. Judges have largely ignored the report's findings and continue to accept bloodstain pattern analysis as expert evidence.

In 2013 Daniel Attinger, a fluid dynamics researcher at Columbia University, published a paper on bloodstain pattern analysis in Forensic Science International, finding that many of the central hypotheses of bloodstain analysis remain untested, and that existing analysts often made incorrect assumptions or other errors in their analyses. The paper also proposed fluid dynamics as a theoretical framework for solving these problems, and Attinger has continued to publish several papers exploring these concepts (as have other scientists as well). However, these papers are largely theoretical, and have had little impact on the use of bloodstain analysis in courts.

Bloodstain types 

A bloodstain can present itself differently depending on the situation and the material on which it appears, and bloodstains may be hard to examine on porous surfaces such as fabric, and may be distorted.  Bloodstain pattern analysts consider the angle of impact to determine its origin and the amount of force behind it; variations in external forces can cause satellite drops. A point of origin can be determined by finding what bloodstain analysts call the "area of convergence" for the blood droplets. To find this point of origin, the shape of the blood and the length are often taken into account and the stringing method is implemented. This method involves drawing lines from each blood splatter and finding the area in which all the blood intersect. Additionally, the angle of impact as well as other external factors such as the material on which the blood falls can change the shape and size of the blood. The point of impact can change the shape of the bloodstain. Bloodstains, instead of maintaining their original forms, may become elongated. In these cases, the blood may have a tail capable of indicating directionality. In order to find the angle of impact investigators measure the length and width of the blood droplet and use the formula . The (A) representing angle of impact.

Impact spatter 

Impact spatter is the most common bloodstain pattern type in a crime scene. It occurs when an object hits a source of blood. In impact blood spatter patterns, blood is often circular and not elongated. There are two types of impact spatter, back spatter and forward spatter. Back spatter occurs when blood is projected back at an attacker, while forward spatter is blood that exits directly from the victim's wound and projects onto nearby surfaces. The speed of the weapon used in the attack can cause changes in the size of blood spatter. The speed of the attack is classified into high, medium and low velocity attacks. High-velocity spatter (e.g., gunshot wounds) create small-sized droplets. High-velocity spatter usually travels 100 feet per second and creates blood droplets sized 1 millimeter or less. Medium-velocity spatter (e.g., blunt force trauma) is often made with a weapon and can create cast-off patterns. They are often made at between 5 to 25 feet/second the blood droplets ranging from 1-4 millimeters in length. Low-velocity spatters are usually created just as a result of blood dripping from the individual (i.e., gravity). Cast-off patterns are associated with impact spatter, these patterns are created when the object that is used in the attack is swung and the blood on the object is swung onto a nearby surface. These patterns may be used to guess the direction of a weapon swing. In these cases, the length and the shape of the bloodstain patterns can help determine the speed of the swing. These patterns create elongated or elliptical shapes in blood when it hits the surface of an object. In 1895, Dr. Eduard Piotrowski's experiment showed that these patterns are often created after the second hit using the weapon.

Research

The reliability of courtroom testimony by bloodstain pattern analysts has come under fire, particularly in the wake of a 2009 report by the National Academy of Sciences, which found the method of analysis to be "subjective rather than scientific", and that it involved an "enormous" degree of uncertainty. In addition to concerns over methodology, the report criticized the lack of proper certification requirements for analysts and an emphasis on "experience over scientific foundations". Many bloodstain pattern analysts have testified in court as experts despite having received training only in the form of a 40-hour course taught independently by MacDonell or one of his students, without institutional accreditation or minimum educational requirements.  Even with proper training and methods, there are still many times where reputable analysts disagree on their findings, which calls into question the reliability of their conclusions and its value as evidence in court.

There is very little empirical evidence to support the use of blood spatter analysis in court or any other aspect of the legal system. While certain aspects of bloodstain pattern analysis, such as methods for determining the impact speeds of splattered blood, are supported by scientific studies, some analysts go well beyond what is verifiable. In addition to problems with the underlying scientific validity of the method, the circumstances of bloodstain pattern analyses, which are often conducted at the behest of either the prosecution or the defense in a court case, can introduce confirmation bias into the analyst's assessment.

In 2016, the Texas Forensic Science Commission reviewed cases that had used bloodstain pattern analysis, and consequently established that starting in 2019, bloodstain pattern analysts will need accreditation to testify as experts in Texas courts.

In 2021, the largest study to date on the accuracy of bloodstain pattern analysis was published in Forensic Science International. The study was based on 33,005 multiple-choice responses and 1760 short text responses, by 75 practicing bloodstain pattern analysts on 192 bloodstain patterns selected to be representative of casework, and stated:

Our results show that conclusions were often erroneous and often contradicted other analysts. On samples with known causes, 11.2% of responses were erroneous. The results show limited reproducibility of conclusions: 7.8% of responses contradicted other analysts. The disagreements with respect to the meaning and usage of BPA terminology and classifications suggest a need for improved standards. Both semantic differences and contradictory interpretations contributed to errors and disagreements, which could have serious implications if they occurred in casework.

Relevant case histories 
A number of court cases are controversial due to their reliance on bloodstain pattern analysis:

Warren Horinek 
A 1995 murder case against Warren Horinek was largely decided based on bloodstain evidence that has been hotly disputed after the fact.  The police and the district attorney's office believed in Horinek's innocence.  The appointed attorneys for the prosecution found a bloodstain pattern analyst who testified that, rather than being a suicide as believed for a number of reasons by police, it was a murder due to the pattern of small blood flecks found on the accused, which according to the analyst had to have come from "high velocity" blood from a gunshot, rather than blood that simply got on him through his attempts to provide medical aid to the victim.  Other bloodstain pattern analysts have since disputed this claim and said that the bloodstains were consistent with medical aid.  The original analyst has conceded that his claim is not as strong as he originally presented it as being, although he still believes in Horinek's guilt.  As of 2017, Horinek remains in prison.

David Camm 
In the criminal case against David Camm, who was tried three times for the murder of his family largely on the basis of blood spatter evidence, both prosecution and the defense used expert bloodstain pattern analysts to interpret the source of the approximately 8 drops of blood on his shirt. The prosecution's experts included Tom Bevel and Rod Englert, who testified that the stains were high-velocity impact spatter. Paul Kish, Barton Epstein, Paulette Sutton, Barrie Goetz, and Stuart H. James testified for the defense that the stains were transferred from his shirt brushing against his daughter's hair. Dr. Robert Shaler, Founding Director of the Penn State Forensic Science Program, decried blood spatter analysis as unreliable in the Camm case. "The problem, in this case, is the number of stains [ ⁠is ⁠] minimal," he said. "I think you're really on the edge of reliability." All of the blood spatter analysts involved in the case are "experts" in the traditional sense. Quoting Shaler, "We have two opinions in this case. That, in essence, is a 50 percent error rate. " This would be ⁠an unacceptable level of reliability in a court case given that the perception of guilt beyond a reasonable doubt is what is required.

Further complicating matters was the testimony of Rob Stites, who testified for the prosecution as an expert blood spatter analyst. It was later uncovered that he had no training and his credentials were fabrications by the prosecutor. His testimony that the blood on Camm's shirt was high-velocity impact spatter aided in the conviction of David Camm. Dr. Shaler pointed out that one limitation of blood spatter analysis testimony is that "you do not have the supporting underlying science" to back up your conclusions. When Stites testified, the jury had no way of knowing that he was not the expert that he purported to be. Even among the expert witnesses, it is unknown which set of experts interpreted the stains accurately as there is no objective way of determining which bloodstain pattern analyst has applied the science correctly.

Travis Stay 
Other times, bloodstain patterns from different causes can mimic each other. In the 2008 trial of Travis Stay for the murder of Joel Lovelien, prosecution witness Terry Laber testified that the blood spatter on Stay's clothing came from blows to Lovelien during a fist fight. After a review of the evidence by Paul Kish, another bloodstain pattern analyst, Laber reviewed the report submitted by Kish and revised his findings to include the possibility that the blood came from expiration by Lovelien.

In popular culture 
 Sam Tyler, the time-travelling detective in episode 3 of the BBC TV series Life on Mars, asks his colleague Chris Skelton to make a blood pattern analysis, quickly realizing by his puzzled expression that in 1973 such techniques are not known.
 Serial killer Dexter Morgan of the Dexter novels and Showtime series is a blood spatter analyst for the fictitious Miami Metro Police Department.
 Julie Finlay is a blood spatter analyst on the CBS series CSI: Crime Scene Investigation.

References

Additional sources
 Bevel, Tom; Gardner, Ross M. Bloodstain Pattern Analysis With an Introduction to Crimescene Reconstruction, 3rd Ed. CRC Press 2008 
 
 Hueske, Edward E., Shooting Incident Investigation/Reconstruction Training Manual, 2002 
 Bremmer et al., Biphasic Oxidation of Oxyhemoglobin in Bloodstains. PLoS ONE 2011.
 James, Stuart H.; Eckert, William G. Interpretation of Bloodstain Evidence at Crime Scenes, 2nd Edition, CRC Press 1999.
 Neitzel, G. Paul; Smith, Marc. The Fluid Dynamics of Droplet Impact on Inclined Surfaces with Application to Forensic Blood Spatter Analysis. Washington, DC: Office of Justice Programs, 2017.
 Solomon, Berg, Martin, & Villee.  Biology, 3rd edition. Saunders College Publishing, Fort Worth, 1993.
 Sutton, Paulette T., Bloodstain Pattern Interpretation, Short Course Manual, University of Tennessee, Memphis TN 1998 
 Vennard, John King. Elementary fluid mechanics. John Wiley & Sons, New York, 1982.

External links
 International Association of Bloodstain Pattern Analysts (IABPA)
 Association for Crime Scene Reconstruction
 Bloodstain Pattern Analysis Terminology – SWGSTAIN terminology with examples
 Bloodstain Pattern Analysis Research – database of BPA-related research articles

Blood
Forensic disciplines
Forensic techniques